Reunion is a 2015 Finnish comedy film directed by Taneli Mustonen. It’s the story of three men, Antti, Niklas and Tuomas, traveling back to their old hometown to attend a high school class party, with the goal of realizing a wild weekend of freedom and fun. The film is starring by Sami Hedberg, Aku Hirviniemi and Jaajo Linnonmaa. The film is a Finnish remake of the 2011 Danish comedy film Klassefesten.

Reunion premiered on February 25, 2015. The film received a very negative reception from critics, and it has even been called the "worst Finnish film of 2015". Despite the criticism, the film received more than 500,000 viewers in the Finnish movie theaters. It was chosen as the audience's favorite film at the 2016 Jussi Awards.

In 2016, the film received a sequel, Reunion 2: The Bachelor Party, which was also directed by Taneli Mustonen. A second sequel to the film, Reunion 3: Singles Cruise, appeared in 2021, and was directed by Renny Harlin instead of Mustonen.

Cast 
 Sami Hedberg as Antti
 Aku Hirviniemi as Niklas
 Jaajo Linnonmaa as Tuomas
 Niina Lahtinen as Jaana
 Helena Vierikko as Leila
 Lotta Kaihua as Hanne
 Lauri Tilkanen as Karno
 Inka Kallén as Reetta
 Taneli Mäkelä as father-in-law / doctor #1
 Pirkka-Pekka Petelius as doctor #2
 Maria Sid as receptionist
 Satu Silvo as nurse

References

External links 

Luokkakokous at Solar Films (in Finnish)

2015 comedy films
2015 films
Finnish comedy films
Remakes of Danish films
Films directed by Taneli Mustonen
2010s Finnish-language films